Crisilla maculata is a species of minute sea snail, a marine gastropod mollusk or micromollusk in the family Rissoidae.

Description

Distribution

References

 Gofas, S.; Le Renard, J.; Bouchet, P. (2001). Mollusca. in: Costello, M.J. et al. (Ed.) (2001). European register of marine species: a check-list of the marine species in Europe and a bibliography of guides to their identification. Collection Patrimoines Naturels. 50: pp. 180–213

External links
Monterosato, T. A. di. (1869). Testacei nuovi dei mari di Sicilia. Tipografia di Ignazio Mirto, printed for the Author, Palermo, 18 pp.; 1 pl. 
 [Appolloni, M.; Smriglio, C.; Amati, B.; Lugliè, L.; Nofroni, I.; Tringali, L. P.; Mariottini, P.; Oliverio, M. (2018). Catalogue of the primary types of marine molluscan taxa described by Tommaso Allery Di Maria, Marquis of Monterosato, deposited in the Museo Civico di Zoologia, Roma. Zootaxa. 4477(1): 1-138.]https://doi.org/10.11646/zootaxa.4477.1.1

Rissoidae
Gastropods described in 1869